The 1933 All-Ireland Senior Hurling Championship Final was the 46th All-Ireland Final and the culmination of the 1933 All-Ireland Senior Hurling Championship, an inter-county hurling tournament for the top teams in Ireland. The match was held at Croke Park, Dublin, on 3 September 1933, between Limerick and Kilkenny. The Munster champions lost to their Leinster opponents on a score line of 1-7 to 0-6.

Match details

1
All-Ireland Senior Hurling Championship Finals
Kilkenny GAA matches
Limerick GAA matches
All-Ireland Senior Hurling Championship Final
All-Ireland Senior Hurling Championship Final, 1933